Elin Tvete (born 31 December 1976) is a Norwegian politician for the Centre Party.

She served as a deputy representative to the Parliament of Norway from Østfold during the term 2017–2021. She is a member Fredrikstad city council.

References

1976 births
Living people
People from Fredrikstad
Deputy members of the Storting
Centre Party (Norway) politicians
Østfold politicians
Norwegian women in politics
Women members of the Storting